Gnostus is a genus of spider beetles in the family Ptinidae. There is one described species in Gnostus, G. floridanus.

References

Further reading

 
 
 
 

Bostrichoidea
Articles created by Qbugbot